Menareh Bazar (also Romanized as Menāreh Bāzār; also known as Minar-Bazar) is a village in Taher Gurab Rural District, in the Central District of Sowme'eh Sara County, Gilan Province, Iran. At the 2006 census, its population was 404, in 118 families.

References 

Populated places in Sowme'eh Sara County